KPMZ may refer to:

KTCK-FM, a radio station (96.7 FM) licensed to Flower Mound, Texas, United States known as KPMZ from 2008 to 2010
ICAO code for Plymouth Municipal Airport (North Carolina) in Plymouth, North Carolina, United States